Leslie Arnold Latcham (born 22 December 1942) is an English former professional footballer who played as a defender. His away début at Manchester United in February 1965 and his 2nd game one week later was in the FA Cup, again against Manchester United, both at Old Trafford. He made 178 appearances for Burnley.

Latcham played for Burnley in the 1966–67 Inter-Cities Fairs Cup, helping the club reach the quarter-finals.

References

External links
Les Latcham career stats at the Post-War Players Database

1942 births
Living people
People from Crook, County Durham
Footballers from County Durham
English footballers
Association football midfielders
Burnley F.C. players
Plymouth Argyle F.C. players
Bradford City A.F.C. players
English Football League players
Great Harwood Town F.C. players